Despina rhodosema is a moth in the family Oecophoridae first described by Edward Meyrick in 1931. It is the only species in the monotypic genus Despina erected by John Frederick Gates Clarke in 1978. It is found in Chile.

References

Moths described in 1931
Oecophorinae
Moths of South America
Endemic fauna of Chile